Progress M-52, identified by NASA as Progress 17P, was a Progress spacecraft used to resupply the International Space Station. It was a Progress-M 11F615A55 spacecraft, with the serial number 352.

Launch
Progress M-52 was launched by a Soyuz-U carrier rocket from Site 1/5 at the Baikonur Cosmodrome. Launch occurred at 19:09:18 UTC on 28 February 2005.

Docking
The spacecraft docked with the port of the Zvezda aft module at 20:10:08 UTC on 2 March 2005. It remained docked for 105 days before undocking at 20:16:10 UTC on 15 June 2005 to make way for Progress M-53. It was deorbited at 23:16:00 UTC on 15 June 2005. The spacecraft burned up in the atmosphere over the Pacific Ocean, with any remaining debris landing in the ocean at around 00:02:41 UTC on 16 June 2005.

Progress M-52 carried supplies to the International Space Station, including food, water and oxygen for the crew and equipment for conducting scientific research. It also carried the TNS-0 (2005-007C) nanosatellite, which was deployed from the ISS on 28 February 2005 at 19:09:18 UTC.

See also

 List of Progress flights
 Uncrewed spaceflights to the International Space Station

References

Spacecraft launched in 2005
Progress (spacecraft) missions
Spacecraft which reentered in 2005
Supply vehicles for the International Space Station
Spacecraft launched by Soyuz-U rockets